Northern Education Trust is a multi-academy trust operating in the North of England. It was established in 2010 and operates 22 academies; 10 primary and 12 secondary. In 2017 it was instrumental in setting up the Northern Alliance of Trusts.

History
All Northern Education Trust schools inspected by Ofsted have now been judged "Good" or "Outstanding".

It has brought a one-size-fits-all approach to its schools, and excluding a large proportion of its students. Questions were raised about the trust's approach to its pupils when it was revealed that they had suspended over 50% of their pupils from Red House Academy in 2017-2018  and 40% of its pupils from North Shore Academy against a national average of 2.3%. Students were given fixed term suspensions for trivial reasons such as choice of jewellery and having eyebrows that were unnaturally dark.

The proportion of students at Red House academy who attained a pass in English and maths rose from 32% in 2017 to 58% in 2019.

Academies
, there are a total of 22 academies affiliated with Northern Education Trust: 10 primary academies and 12 secondary academies.

Secondary academies
 The Blyth Academy
 Dyke House Sports and Technology College
 Freebrough Academy
 The Grangefield Academy
 Hetton Academy
 Kearsley Academy
 Kirk Balk Academy
 Manor Community Academy
 North Shore Academy
 Red House Academy
 Thorp Academy
 Walbottle Academy

Primary academies
Abbey Park Academy
Badger Hill Academy
The Ferns Primary Academy
Frederick Nattrass Primary Academy
Hilton Primary Academy
Merlin Top Primary Academy
Mount Pellon Primary Academy
Norton Primary Academy
The Oak Tree Academy
Whitecliffe Academy

Northern Alliance of Trusts
The Conservative education minister, Lord Agnew, in response to comments that academies are no better at managing deprived schools than the Local education authority they replaced, urged smaller academy trusts to team up to create bigger academy trusts. The Northern Alliance is the first formal partnership of its kind between larger chains.

The Northern Alliance of Trusts is made up of eight members:

  Northern Education Trust
  Astrea Academy Trust
  Delta Academies Trust
  Dixons Academies Trust
  Horizons Specialist Academy Trust
  North East Learning Trust
  Outwood Grange Academies Trust
  WISE Academies

The academy trusts continue to act as independent legal entities, but were sharing resource for the good of its members.

It receives a public money grant from the Strategic School Improvement Fund which targeted resources at the schools most in need to improve school performance and pupil attainment. They favoured schemes where schools helped each other. It was opened in 2017 and gave grants for two years.
. The alliance is working on common procurement, leadership standards, fund raising and to  work on recruitment and retention of teachers.

References

External links
Official website

Academy trusts